Jí is the Mandarin pinyin romanization of the Chinese surname written  in Chinese character. It is romanized as Chi in Wade–Giles, and Zik in Cantonese. Ji is listed 275th in the Song dynasty classic text Hundred Family Surnames. It is not among the 300 most common surnames in China.

Origin
According to the Zuo Zhuan and the Song dynasty encyclopedia Tongzhi, the surname Ji 籍 originated from Bo Yan (伯黡), a chief minister of the state of Jin, a major power of the Spring and Autumn period. Boyan was in charge of government records, and was commonly referred to as Ji Yan (ji 籍 means record). His descendants adopted Ji as their surname.

During the Chu–Han Contention, many people surnamed Ji 籍 changed their surname to Xi 席 because of naming taboo of Xiang Yu, the Hegemon-King of Western Chu, whose given name was Ji 籍.

Notable people
Bo Yan (伯黡) or Ji Yan, chief minister of the state of Jin
Ji Yan or Ji You (籍偃, fl. 6th century BC), official serving under Duke Dao of Jin
Ji Tan (籍谈, fl. 6th century BC), son of Ji You, official serving under Duke Ping of Jin
Ji Qin (籍秦, fl. 6th century BC), a younger son of Ji You, official serving under Duke Qing of Jin
Ji Ru (籍孺), Western Han eunuch
Ji Zhongyin (籍忠寅; 1877–1930), Qing dynasty and Republic of China politician
Ji Xiaocheng (籍孝诚; 1923–2019), paediatrician, introduced perinatal medicine to China

References

Chinese-language surnames
Individual Chinese surnames